The term "Blue Shirts", when used by itself, can refer to several organizations, mostly fascist organizations found in the 1920s and 1930s.

Politics
 The American National Blue Shirt Minutemen
 The British Fascists
 The Blueshirts, the paramilitary wing of the National Unity Party (Parti National Social Chrétien du Canada)
 The Chinese Blue Shirts Society
A blue shirt has been worn by several socialist youth organizations since the early 1920s as a distinctive mark to symbolize their affiliation with the labour movement as blue is a common colour of workwear. These include Hashomer Hatzair, HaNoar HaOved VeHaLomed, Socialist Youth Austria, Socialist Youth of Germany – Falcons, and others.
 The Free German Youth, the official socialist youth movement of the German Democratic Republic and the Socialist Unity Party of Germany
 The French groups:
Mouvement Franciste
Solidarité Française
 The Irish Blueshirts
 National Syndicalists (Portugal)
 The Romanian Lăncieri
 The Spanish Falange; see also Blueshirts (Falange)
 The Egyptian Blue Shirts (al-Qumsan al-zarqa'), a junior movement of the Wafd Party
 The Italian Blue shirts
 National Socialist Workers' Party (Sweden)'s version of the SA had blue shirts

Sports
 The Toronto Blueshirts
 "Broadway Blueshirts" or simply "Blueshirts", a common nickname for the New York Rangers
 in American college sports, a colloquial designation for a walk-on assumed to eventually obtain a scholarship; derivative of redshirt

Other
 Les Tuniques Bleues, a Belgian comic about the American Civil War
 Derogatory term for Transportation Security Administration Agents comparing them to the Nazi Brown Shirts